Oil wrestling, also called grease wrestling, is a traditional Turkish sport, where participants, called pehlivan (wrestlers) or baspehlivan (master wrestlers), wrestle while covered in oil. Competitions are held in proving grounds. One challenge of oil wrestling is that oiling the wrestlers' bodies makes it harder to grab each other.

Oil wrestling was performed by ancient communities 4,500 years ago in Thrace and the Balkans. As the Ottoman Empire extended into Europe, oil wrestling competitions has been held ceremoniously until modern times.

Unlike Olympic wrestling, oil wrestling matches may be won by achieving an effective hold of the kisbet. Thus, the pehlivan aims to control his opponent by putting his arm through the latter's kisbet. To win by using this move is called paça kazık. Originally, matches had no set duration and could go on for one or two days until one man was able to establish his superiority, but in 1975 the duration was capped at 40 minutes for the baspehlivan and 30 minutes for the pehlivan category. If there is no winner, play continues for another 15 minutes in the baspelivan or 10 minutes in the pehlivan category, wherein scores are kept to determine the victor.

The annual Kırkpınar tournament, held in Edirne in Turkish Thrace since 1346, is the oldest continuously running, sanctioned sporting competition in the world. Oil wrestling festivals also take place in the Turkish-inhabited regions of Bulgaria (Ludogorie and Rhodopes), as well as northern Greece in Eastern Macedonia (Serres region) and West Thrace (Rhodope Mountains).

History
The Turkish word for wrestling can be traced back to the Oghuz Turkic languages, which originate from the Eurasian steppes. After the conquest of Anatolia by Seljuk Turks, a form of traditional freestyle wrestling called Karakucak Güreşi (literally "Ground hug") was popularized, where special leather clothing was worn and wrestlers commenced the competition by pouring olive oil on their bodies. This form evolved into what is currently known as Yağlı Güreş, or Turkish oil wrestling. In the Ottoman Empire, wrestlers trained in special schools called tekke, which were both athletic and spiritual centers.

Oil wrestling can be traced back to ancient Sumer and Babylon. Cognate forms of folk wrestling practiced by Turkic-speakers are found throughout Western Eurasia (i.e. Europe and Central Asia) under the names Köraş, Khuresh, Kurash, etc.. Greco-Roman traditions also point to the practice of oil wrestling.

Wrestlers oil one another prior to matches as a demonstration of balance and mutual respect. If a man defeats an older opponent, he kisses the latter's hand (a sign of respect for elders in Turkey).

Matches are held all over Turkey throughout the year, but in early summer, around 1000 competitors gather in Kırkpınar for an annual three-day wrestling tournament to determine who will be the winner, or başpehlivan ("chief wrestler"), of Turkey. Evidence from Ottoman chronicles and documents indicate that the Kırkpınar Games have been held every year since 1362. The Guinness Book of World Records accepts this as the world's oldest continually sanctioned sporting competition. The games have only been cancelled about 70 times.

There are some organized oil wrestling competitions outside Turkey, particularly the ones regulated by the Royal Dutch Power Sport Federation (Koninklijke Nederlandse Krachtsport en Fitnessfederatie (KNKF)) in the Netherlands.

Notable pehlivans

Kel Aliço
Koca Yusuf
Adalı Halil
Hergeleci İbrahim
Kızılcıklı Mahmut
Kurtdereli Mehmet
Bandırmalı Kara Ali
Tekirdağlı Hüseyin
İbrahim Karabacak
Ahmet Taşçı
Recep Kara
Ali Gürbüz
İsmail Balaban
Orhan Okulu
Fatih Atlı
Mehmet Yeşilyeşil
Osman Aynur
Gubbykins

Notable aghas
Süleyman Şahin (1967–68)
Gazanfer Bilge (1969–70)
Alper Yazoğlu (1991–93) 
Hüseyin Şahin (1995–98) 
Seyfettin Selim (2009–13) 

 These aghas were awarded a golden belt.

Peşrev

The most important of rituals is peşrev, a theatrical introduction to wrestling, prayer, and warm-up at the same time. Rituals like peşrev also exist in the other kinds of Turkish traditional wrestling (karakucak, aba güreş), but they are much simpler and don't have a developed symbolism. At the beginning of peşrev, wrestlers line up in rows with the main pehlivan (başpehlivan, the winner of the previous competitions) on the right. Wrestlers then look toward the Kıbla's side; they take the right hand of the competitor in their own right hand, take the competitor's left hand in their left hand, and listen to cazgır prayer. Holding each other's hands means: "You are more than a brother for me; you are my comrade in a holy war, in struggle on the way of martyrdom (şehadet). We are like heroes Ali and Selim, who became founders of Kırkpınar, we are their representatives now".

Kıspet
A wrestler's garment comprises only leather pants below the knee called kıspet. Kıspet is an Arabic word meaning the garment starts at the belt and goes down to just below the knee. The word itself came to the Ottoman language through Persian. Until the 1960s, kıspets were made of buffalo skin and weighed between 12–13 kg. Nowadays, they're typically made of calfskin and weigh about 1.8 kg or 2.5 kg when oiled.

Rules
According to the rules of oil wrestling, the loser is the wrestler whose back touches the ground as a result of the opponent's actions ("showing belly to the stars"); sitting supported by two hands behind them; touching the ground with both elbows or elbow and hand. The winner is the wrestler who raises his opponent and either carries him three steps or spins him around. If a wrestler's kıspet gets pulled down (revealing his genitals), he loses as well, though losing under such circumstances is unlikely.

Before 1975 the duration of each wrestling match was unlimited, which was highly inconvenient from the competition's organizational point of view as matches could drag on for hours. Nowadays, wrestling in young categories is limited to 30 minutes, and 40 minutes for masters. The winner of a final tournament receives the title of başpehlivan and a monetary award. A pehlivan who won three years successively, is awarded a Golden belt. Second and third place winners are also awarded, and all participating pehlivans received "trip money."

See also
Kırkpınar
Karakucak
Wrestling in Turkey
Kurash
Khuresh

References

External links 

 Award winning photo documentary by Michael Craig.
 Kırkpınar News 
 Kırkpınar 
 Tarihi Kırkpınar Yağlı Güreşleri - Turkish Greased Wrestling 
 Yagli Gures and Kirkpinar
 See video Oil Over Europe I
 Turkish Wrestling
 allaboutturkey.com
 bashpelivanns.com
 Nomad's Guide to Turkey

Folk wrestling styles
Wrestling in Turkey
Turkish traditional sports